Andreas Endre Eidsaa, Jr. (born 17 November 1970) is a Norwegian politician for the Christian Democratic Party.

From 1993 to 1996 he served as the chairman of the Youth of the Christian People's Party, the youth wing of the Christian Democratic Party.

He served as a deputy representative to the Norwegian Parliament from Rogaland during the term 1993–1997.

References

1970 births
Living people
Christian Democratic Party (Norway) politicians
Deputy members of the Storting
Rogaland politicians